The 2016 Euro RX of Belgium was the second round of the forty-first season of the FIA European Rallycross Championship. The event was held at the Circuit Jules Tacheny Mettet in Mettet, Wallonia as an undercard to the 2016 World RX of Belgium and hosted the Supercar and TouringCar classes.

Supercar

Heats

Semi-finals
Semi-Final 1

Semi-Final 2

Final

TouringCar

Heats

Semi-finals
Semi-Final 1

Semi-Final 2

Final

Standings after the event

Supercar standings

TouringCar standings

 Note: Only the top five positions are included for both sets of standings.

References

|- style="text-align:center"
|width="35%"|Previous race:2016 Euro RX of Portugal
|width="35%"|FIA European RallycrossChampionship2016 season
|width="35%"|Next race:2016 Euro RX of Great Britain

Belgium
Euro RX